Vilar do Monte  may refer to the following parishes in Portugal:

Vilar do Monte (Barcelos), a parish in the municipality of Barcelos
Vilar do Monte (Macedo de Cavaleiros), a parish in the municipality of Macedo de Cavaleiros 
Vilar do Monte (Ponte de Lima), a parish in the municipality of Ponte de Lima